Aung Swe Naing is a three times  the Mr. Myanmar event, and five times the national fitness competition Mr. Crusher winning Burmese bodybuilder. He is one of the most successful bodybuilder in Myanmar.

He grabbed the gold medal at the 2010 SEA Championships- Men Bodybuilding 80 kg and 
at SEA Championships 2012. He got silver medal in their 80 kg category bodybuilding contest at the SEA Games Myanmar 2013 at Myanmar Convention Centre  in Yangon , Myanmar.

Competitive placings

2013 SEA Championships (2nd- Men bodybuilder)
2012	SEA Championships (1st — Men Bodybuilding 90 kg)
2011	Asian and World Bodybuilding & Physique Sports Championships (8th — Asian Men Bodybuilding 85 kg)
2010	South East Asian Championships (1st — Men Bodybuilding 80 kg)
Asian Championships for Juniors, Fitness, Women and Invitational (2nd — Men Bodybuilding Invitational)

References

Burmese bodybuilders
Living people
Professional bodybuilders
People from Yangon
Burmese male bodybuilders
Year of birth missing (living people)